John Stead may refer to:

 John Stead (mayor) (1854-1922), Scottish-born New Zealand politician, father of Billy Stead
 Billy Stead (John William Stead, 1877–1958), rugby union player
 John Stead (bishop), Anglican bishop of Willochra
 John Edward Stead (1851–1923), British metallurgist

See also
Jon Stead (born 1983), English footballer